Sandwell General Hospital is an acute teaching hospital of the Sandwell and West Birmingham Hospitals NHS Trust in West Bromwich, England and provides an extensive range of general and specialist hospital services.

History

The hospital started as an infirmary which was added to the West Bromwich union workhouse in 1884. Improvements were begun in 1925, when the infirmary then became a separate institution named Hallam Hospital. After the creation of the NHS and rebuilding in the 1970s, the hospital was renamed Sandwell General Hospital.

A new £18m Emergency Services Centre opened on the Sandwell General Hospital campus in April 2005. This facility replaced the old A&E department destroyed by the largest fire in National Health Service history. It incorporates a comprehensive A&E facility, Emergency Assessment Unit and Cardiac Care Unit. The model of care has been developed with primary care to provide a fully integrated service.

Emergency coronary care was transferred from the hospital to City Hospital, Birmingham in 2015.

A major rebuilding project is planned involving a new 670-bed hospital with 15 operating theatres - the Midland Metropolitan University Hospital, in Smethwick.

Facilities
Sandwell General Hospital provides a comprehensive range of medical and nursing services including general medicine, surgery, urology, plastic surgery, orthopaedics, gastroenterology, rheumatology, interventional cardiology (including percutaneous coronary intervention for acute myocardial infarction since 2005) and paediatrics.

See also
 List of hospitals in England

References

NHS hospitals in England
Hospital buildings completed in 2005
West Bromwich
Hospitals in the West Midlands (county)
Teaching hospitals in England
Poor law infirmaries